The New Orleans Levee was a New Orleans-based, American satire publication founded by editor and publisher Rudy Matthew Vorkapic. It printed 25000 copies monthly. The Levees tagline was "We Don't Hold Anything Back". The paper targeted area politicians and some non-politicians whom the paper's staff saw as ruining the recovery efforts after the levee failures amid Hurricane Katrina in New Orleans.

Notes

References 

Newspapers published in New Orleans
Publications established in 2006
Satirical newspapers